The Seven Shrines of the Abkhaz in Abkhazia are considered holy in the Abkhaz traditional religion and are known and respected by most Abkhazians.

Shrines

See also
 Abkhaz neopaganism
 Council of Priests of Abkhazia

References

Sources 

Religion in Abkhazia
Religious sites in Georgia (country)
Mountains of Abkhazia